Horton Grand Hotel is a restoration of two historic hotels, the Grand Horton and the Brooklyn Kahle Saddlery, in downtown San Diego, California.  The Horton-Grand was added to the National Register of Historic Places in 1980.

History
Built in 1887 by Comstock & Trotsche, the Grand Horton was a luxury hotel with a design based on the Innsbruck Inn in Vienna, Austria.  The Grand Horton was part of a building boom following the opening of the city's first transcontinental railroad connection in 1885.  It is in the Italianate Victorian architecture style.

The Brooklyn-Kahle Saddlery Hotel was a less formal hotel that combined Western/Cowboy and Victorian styles.  Built around the same time as the Grand Horton, it was originally known as the Brooklyn Hotel, but was later renamed the Kahle Saddlery due to the presence of a prominent saddle and harness shop on the building's first floor starting in 1912.

Dismantled
Both hotels were scheduled for demolition in the 1970s when the City of San Diego purchased them to build the Horton Plaza shopping center on the site.  The hotels were dismantled brick by brick, with each brick numbered, catalogued, and stored. In 1986 the hotels were rebuilt into an entirely new hotel at the present location at Fourth Street and Island Avenue.

See also
 National Register of Historic Places listings in San Diego County, California

References

External links

 Horton Grand History

Hotel buildings on the National Register of Historic Places in California
National Register of Historic Places in San Diego
Hotel buildings completed in 1887
Italianate architecture in California
Victorian architecture in California
Railway hotels in the United States
Gaslamp Quarter, San Diego
Hotels in San Diego
1887 establishments in California